Sechelt (Shishalh language chat'lich) is a district municipality located on the lower Sunshine Coast of British Columbia. Approximately 50 km northwest of Vancouver, it is accessible from mainland British Columbia by a 40-minute ferry trip between Horseshoe Bay and Langdale, and a 25-minute drive from Langdale along Highway 101, also known as the Sunshine Coast Highway. The name Sechelt  is derived from the Sechelt language word, shishalh, the name of the First Nations people who first settled the area thousands of years ago.

The original Village of Sechelt was incorporated on February 15, 1956. Sechelt later expanded its boundaries in 1986 with the inclusion of a number of adjacent unincorporated areas. The District of Sechelt, as it is known today, encompasses some 39.71 km² (15.33 sq mi) at the isthmus of the Sechelt Peninsula, between the southern tip of Sechelt Inlet (Porpoise Bay) and the Strait of Georgia that separates the provincial mainland from Vancouver Island.

Sechelt is a seaside community with approx. 35 kilometers of Pacific Ocean shoreline that extends primarily along the coastline of the Sunshine Coast, and is bounded to the west and east by the unincorporated communities of Halfmoon Bay and Roberts Creek, respectively.  The 2016 Canadian census placed its population at 10,200.  Sechelt is the seat of the Sunshine Coast Regional District of British Columbia.

Although its population is relatively small for its geographical area, Sechelt has several distinct neighbourhoods. From east to west, they are Wilson Creek, Davis Bay, Selma Park, the original Village of Sechelt, and West Sechelt.  Several neighbourhoods around Sechelt Inlet were also included in Sechelt's 1986 incorporation as a district; these include West Porpoise Bay, East Porpoise Bay, Sandy Hook, Tillicum Bay and Tuwanek.  The municipal government of the Shishalh First Nation, which contains a substantial commercial district, is immediately east of Sechelt's "downtown" village.

History
The original inhabitants of Sechelt are the Sechelt Nation, a British Columbian First Nations band who call themselves shishalh (or shishalh Nation).  Before English was spoken, the town of Sechelt was called ch'atlich in she shashishalhem (the Sechelt language). For thousands of years, the Sechelt people practiced a hunting and gathering subsistence strategy, making extensive use of the natural food resources located around Sechelt, and its strategic location for access into the Sechelt Inlet.

Europeans began settling in Sechelt in the 1860s and by the 1880s, it had become an active centre of the logging and fishing industries with the construction of sawmills and wharves. With sustained contact with European settlers, the Sechelt people's semi-nomadic way of life began to be substituted for a more sedentary life in Sechelt, a change heavily influenced by the establishment of a Roman Catholic church by the Oblates of Mary Immaculate. Our Lady of the Rosary was completed in 1890 and cost the Sechelt people a sum of $8,000 to construct. In 1906, this church was destroyed in a fire, and a year later another church was erected in its place called Our Lady of Lourdes but this too was also destroyed by fire in October, 1970.

The natural beauty of the Sunshine Coast soon attracted tourists, who arrived at the wharves at Trail Bay via steamship.  The construction of the original provincial highway in 1952, Highway 101, now also known as Sunshine Coast Highway, and the accompanying commencement of ferry service to Horseshoe Bay (near Vancouver) and Powell River (hence to Vancouver Island) accelerated tourism and residential growth, which continues today.  .

Geography
Sechelt is a municipality on the Sunshine Coast, west northwest of Vancouver BC. Sechelt is located on an isthmus, a narrow strip of land that bridges between the Sechelt Peninsula and the BC mainland. This isthmus is bounded on the north by the Sechelt Inlet, and on the south by the Strait of Georgia.

The municipality consists of 4 non-contiguous areas, all separated by the Sechelt Indian Government District.

Climate 
Sechelt's climate is Cfb (Temperate Oceanic) according to the Köppen climate classification, and is designated as Plant Hardiness Zone 8a by Environment Canada. It has the warmest nights in Canada.

Demographics 

Ethnicity

Religion 
According to the 2021 census, religious groups in Sechelt included:
Irreligion (5,955 persons or 56.1%)
Christianity (4,010 persons or 37.8%)
Buddhism (170 persons or 1.6%)
Sikhism (150 persons or 1.4%)
Islam (75 persons or 0.7%)
Judaism (95 persons or 0.9%)
Hinduism (40 persons or 0.4%)
Other (125 persons or 1.2%)

Attractions 
The village itself, the original locus of Sechelt, includes Clayton's Heritage Market (a grocery store named after its pioneering family owners) in Trail Bay Mall.  A new public library with municipal hall opened in 1997, and a combined provincial courthouse and Royal Canadian Mounted Police (RCMP) building, and a public recreation aquatic centre serving Sechelt and the surrounding area, have also been completed since that time.

Immediately to the east of the downtown village are the Sechelt or shishalh First Nation Band Lands, containing a shopping centre, movie theatre, museum, gift shop and one of the largest open-pit gravel quarries in North America.

Other Sechelt area landmarks include:

 Sechelt Hospital (originally St. Mary's, the Sunshine Coast's first hospital, renamed in 2015)
 A satellite campus of Capilano University
 The local regional government offices of the Sunshine Coast Regional District
 Sechelt airport, presently a small regional aerodrome, a few kilometres east of the downtown village in the Wilson Creek neighbourhood
 Davis Bay, with a public seawall walk, wharf, and lands for a public waterfront park, presently known as Mission Point Park

Recreation and tourism
Like other parts of the Sunshine Coast, Sechelt is known for its natural beauty, and is a popular destination for outdoor activities that include kayaking, diving, snowshoeing and skiing, hiking and backpacking, camping and mountain biking. There is an 18-hole public golf course, and a number of small marinas are available around Sechelt Inlet. Sechelt has several municipal parks, and larger provincial parks are nearby.

Auto enthusiasts come from around the Pacific Northwest for Sechelt's annual Sleepy Hollow Rod Run, and the "Show and Shine" held in conjunction with the August drag races at Sechelt Airport.

Notable parks and conservation areas

Hidden Groves 
The Hidden Groves area of old growth forest adjoins the Sandy Hook neighbourhood, 6 km from downtown Sechelt and 2 km from Porpoise Bay Provincial Park. It has trails for walkers and hikers of various abilities, from easy walks of around 15 minutes to more strenuous treks of 3 or 4 kilometres.  A wheelchair-accessible trail of 480 metres into the Ancient Grove area is also suitable for people with walkers, strollers, and those not so fit. A second 400-metre accessibility trail loops from the entrance kiosk through pristine forest and back.

The entrance kiosk features a large map of the trails. All trails are well-marked and maintained. There are signs at all intersections with directions, maps and guides.

The Groves includes giant ancient trees, maple wetland, and rocky promontories with views of Vancouver Island and Sechelt Inlet. There is parking at the entrance to the trails. It is a legal off-leash area for dogs.

The Sechelt Heritage Forest portion of the Groves is a protected interpretive forest as designated by the Province. Hidden Grove is currently part of the BC Forest and under a special tenure to the Sechelt Community Forest, which has declared the Grove a special high-priority recreational area and mandated it shall not be logged. Volunteers provide daily maintenance.

Porpoise Bay Provincial Park  
Porpoise Bay Provincial Park is some 4 km north of downtown Sechelt, on the east side of Sechelt Inlet. It is characterized by second-growth forest, open grassy areas and sandy beaches.

Education
The School District 46 Sunshine Coast operates public schools in the region.

The Conseil scolaire francophone de la Colombie-Britannique operates two Francophone schools in that city: the école du Pacifique primary school and école secondaire Chatelech.

Gallery

See also
Sechelt Peninsula
Sechelt Inlet
Porpoise Bay Provincial Park
Mount Richardson Provincial Park

Notes

References

Community Profile: Sechelt District Municipality, Sunshine Coast Regional District, British Columbia; Statistics Canada
A brief history of Sechelt
The District of Sechelt
The Hidden Groves

External links

 
District municipalities in British Columbia
Populated places in the Sunshine Coast Regional District